Abies borisii-regis (Bulgarian fir) is a species of fir native to the mountains of the Balkan Peninsula in Bulgaria, northern Greece, Kosovo,  North Macedonia, Albania and Serbia. It occurs at altitudes of 800–1,800 m, on mountains with an annual rainfall of over 1,000 mm.

It is a large evergreen coniferous tree growing to 40–50 m (exceptionally 60 m) tall and with a trunk diameter of up to 1.5 m. The leaves are needle-like, flattened, 1.8–3.5 cm long and 2 mm wide by 0.5 mm thick, glossy dark green above, and with two blue-white bands of stomata below. The tip of the leaf is variable, usually pointed, but sometimes slightly notched at the tip, particularly on slow-growing shoots on older trees. The cones are 10–21 cm long and 4 cm broad, with about 150–200 scales, each scale with an exserted bract and two winged seeds; they disintegrate when mature to release the seeds.

It is closely related to (and in many respects intermediate between) silver fir to the north in central Europe, Greek fir to the south in southern Greece, and Nordmann fir to the east in northern Turkey. Some botanists treat it as a natural hybrid between silver Fir and Greek fir, while others treat it as a variety of silver fir, as Abies alba var. acutifolia. Another synonym is Abies pardei.

The scientific name honours Tsar Boris III of Bulgaria, during whose reign it was described as a new species in 1925. The name is sometimes cited without a hyphen (Abies borisiiregis), though under the provisions of ICBN Article 60.9 the hyphen is to be retained.

See also
List of Balkan endemic plants
List of organisms named after famous people (born 1800–1899)

References

External links

 Abies borisii-regis. Distribution map, genetic conservation units and related resources. European Forest Genetic Resources Programme (EUFORGEN) 
 

borisii-regis
Flora of Bulgaria
Taxobox binomials not recognized by IUCN